Kazagići may refer to:

 Kazagići (Goražde)
 Kazagići (Kiseljak)